Jean-Claude Requier (born 4 October 1947) is a French politician and a French Senator.

He was also mayor of Martel, Lot and a member of the Regional Council of Occitania.

Sources 

1947 births
Living people
Senators of Lot (department)
Mayors of places in Occitania (administrative region)
Radical Party (France) politicians
People from Lot (department)